Horace S. Cooley (1806 – April 2, 1850) was an American politician.

Born in Hartford, Connecticut, Cooley studied medicine and then law. In 1840, Cooley moved to Rushville, Illinois and then finally settled in Quincy, Illinois. In 1842, Cooley was appointed quartermaster general of Illinois. In 1846, Cooley was appointed to and then elected Illinois Secretary of State. Cooley was a Democrat. He died in 1850 while still in office.

Notes

1806 births
1850 deaths
Politicians from Hartford, Connecticut
People from Quincy, Illinois
Secretaries of State of Illinois
Illinois Democrats
19th-century American politicians